The Saturday Evening Girls club (1899-1969) was a Progressive Era reading group for young immigrant women in Boston's North End. The club hosted educational discussions and lectures as well as social events, published a newspaper called the S. E. G. News, and operated the acclaimed Paul Revere Pottery. Financed by philanthropist Helen Storrow and run by librarian Edith Guerrier and her partner, artist Edith Brown, the club originated at the North Bennet Street Industrial School (NBSIS), a community charity building that provided educational opportunities and vocational training. Meetings were later held at the Library Club House at 18 Hull Street. Storrow also provided a house in Gloucester, Massachusetts, where club members could vacation in the summer.

Mission 

The purpose of the club was to provide intellectual and social stimulation for the young working-class women of the North End, most of whom were from Italian Catholic or Eastern European Jewish immigrant families. At the time, the North End was an overcrowded tenement neighborhood with the highest child mortality rate in the city. Like many other clubs and charity organizations of the era, those at NBSIS were designed to Americanize young people by exposing them to middle-class White Anglo-Saxon Protestant culture. Additionally, Guerrier was instructed to "draw these girls in, from the perils of the street"; that is, to keep them away from saloons, dance halls, and other amusements which were seen as unsavory and leading to prostitution. In reality, most Jewish and Italian immigrant girls in those days were closely watched over by their families and forbidden to leave the house at night without a chaperone.

History

Founding 

In 1899, a young art student named Edith Guerrier applied for a position in the day nursery at the North Bennet Street Industrial School. She approached the school's founder, Helen Storrow, with a letter of introduction from her uncle, William Garrison, Jr., who was an old friend of Guerrier's father. Soon afterwards, Guerrier was tasked with maintaining the school's reading room, officially known as "Station W" of the Boston Public Library. Her story-hour quickly gained immense popularity with young women at the school, forming the foundation of what in 1901 became the Saturday Evening Girls' Club (S.E.G.).

Activities 

The multiple reading groups that Guerrier led were organized and named after the day of the week the women met; the Saturday Evening Girls consisted mostly of young women with jobs or family obligations that kept them busy the rest of the week. Through activities and group discussions, the S.E.G. exposed the women to an array of experiences across religious, language, and ethnic divides. Weekly meetings covered subjects such as music, literature, art, economics, and job opportunities. Often, prominent members of the Boston community would attend the S.E.G. meetings and give lectures or lead group discussions on historical or contemporary issues. Speakers included a variety of professionals, academics, religious leaders, activists, artists, and writers. The club also organized parties, plays, folk-dancing recitals, and concerts by local performers. Around 1906, Storrow bought a 14-bedroom house on Wingaersheek Beach in West Gloucester, Massachusetts, as a summer camp for club members. Storrow paid for a director and an assistant, and the members paid most of their own expenses. 

In addition to the funding from Helen Storrow, the club depended on volunteer work and donations. To raise funds, club members ran a restaurant and put on plays and other performances. In 1910 they staged a production of The Merchant of Venice at the home of Isabella Stewart Gardner. S. E. G. Club members contributed financially to the clubs for the younger women and girls, as well as mentoring them. Each member was also expected to contribute an hour of service each week to the clubhouse. In 1914, busy with other projects, Storrow withdrew her support for the library clubs, and the Saturday Evening Girls took over the responsibility. The clubs were moved to a space in the new North End branch of the library. 

Involvement in the S.E.G. provided the space to advance women's education in a manner that worked outside of traditional education methods, exposing the young women to opportunities for socializing without fear of provocation for being female, or for belonging to a specific religious group or ethnicity. The women participating in S.E.G. stand out from turn-of-the-century women at large, as S.E.G.'s members pursued higher education at a significantly higher rate than the native-born women surrounding them.

Notable speakers 

 Cyrus E. Dallin
 Paul Revere Frothingham
 Edward Everett Hale
 Heloise Hersey 
 Charles Eliot Norton
 Vida Dutton Scudder
 James J. Storrow
 Edmund von Mach

The S. E. G. News 

The club published a newspaper, the S. E. G. News, from 1912 to 1917. The editor in chief was Fanny Goldstein (May 15, 1895 - December 26, 1961), a Russian immigrant who had left school to go to work at 13. Goldstein continued her education part-time, taking evening classes at Simmons College (now Simmons University), Boston University, and Harvard University. She went on to head the West End branch of the Boston Public Library, where she worked with noted journalist and librarian George Washington Forbes. Goldstein conceived the idea for Jewish Book Week in Boston in the 1920s; her idea was later adopted by Jewish communities across the country.

The S. E. G. News printed club announcements, editorials (such as "Dire Dress" by Fanny Goldstein), informational articles (such as "Telegraphy as a Vocation for Women" by Sarah Wolk), personal reminiscences (such as "Fifteen Years Later" by Frank Rizzo), poetry by Charlotte Perkins Stetson and Evelyn Underhill, children's plays by Edith Guerrier, book reviews, lists of recommended magazine articles, and advertisements for local businesses such as Hood's Milk. Contemporary issues such as Zionism and preparedness for war were also addressed. Newsletters such as the S. E. G. News made a small but significant contribution to the education of their readers.

The Paul Revere Pottery 

In 1908, Edith Guerrier and Edith Brown, with financial help from Helen Storrow, started a small pottery in the cellar of their home in Chestnut Hill, Massachusetts. Soon afterwards it was moved to the basement of the Library Club House at 18 Hull Street. It was named the Paul Revere Pottery because of its proximity to the Old North Church, where friends of Paul Revere had famously hung two lanterns to signal to him that the British were coming. In 1915 it moved to the Aberdeen section of Boston's Brighton neighborhood. In 1916, it was incorporated as the Paul Revere Pottery Company.

The pottery was more than an arts and crafts project designed to keep young women off the streets; it provided them with decent jobs. Working conditions at the pottery were better than the women could have expected elsewhere: they worked an eight-hour day and received a fair wage, daily hot lunches, and a yearly paid vacation. The pottery flourished for several decades, garnering national and international recognition through features in magazines, journals, and newsletters. It closed its doors in 1942. Paul Revere wares are now valuable collectors' items.

Disbandment 

Although the club's membership began to dwindle after World War I, the Saturday Evening Girls continued to meet on an irregular basis until the club was dissolved in 1969. 

Papers and photographs pertaining to the club were collected by Barbara Maysles Kramer and are available in the Joseph P. Healey Library, University of Massachusetts Boston. 18 Hull Street, formerly the Library Club House, is a site on the Boston Women's Heritage Trail.

See also 

 North Bennet Street School 
 History of Italian Americans in Boston
 Settlement movement
 Arts and Crafts movement

References

Sources

Further reading

Fiction 

 The Saturday Evening Girls Club by Jane Healey (Lake Union Publishing, 2017) tells the story of four best friends coming of age in the North End at the turn of the 20th century. The women are young, working-class, Italian and Jewish immigrants whose lives are changed by the Saturday Evening Girls Club. Helen Storrow, Edith Guerrier, Fanny Goldstein, and other actual people involved in the club make occasional appearances in the novel.

 The Boston Girl by Anita Diamant (Scribner, 2014) is a novel set in Boston in the early 20th century; several characters belong to the Saturday Evening Girls club (referred to in the novel as the Saturday Club) and work in the pottery.

 Under Copp's Hill by Katherine Ayres (Open Road Media, 2014), part of the American Girl History Mysteries series, is set in Boston's North End in 1908 and features Edith Guerrier's "library club."

External Links 

Records of the Saturday Evening Girls, 1915-1991.Schlesinger Library, Radcliffe Institute, Harvard University.
North End, Boston
Women's clubs in the United States
Defunct clubs and societies of the United States
Progressive Era in the United States
1899 in women's history
History of women in Massachusetts
Women in Boston